Margarosticha nesiotes is a moth in the family Crambidae. It was described by Eugene G. Munroe in 1959. It is found on the St. Matthias Islands in northern Papua New Guinea.

References

Acentropinae
Moths described in 1959